Matthew Jackson (born 15 August 1974) is a former Australian rules footballer who played with St Kilda in the Australian Football League (AFL).

Jackson, a rover from the Central Dragons, was selected by St Kilda with pick 46 in the 1992 National Draft. He played four games for St Kilda, all in the 1995 AFL season.

References

1974 births
Australian rules footballers from Victoria (Australia)
St Kilda Football Club players
Sandringham Dragons players
Living people